In logic and philosophy, an argument is an attempt to persuade someone of something, or give evidence or reasons for accepting a particular conclusion.

Argument may also refer to:

Mathematics and computer science
Argument (complex analysis), a function which returns the polar angle of a complex number
Command-line argument, an item of information provided to a program when it is started
Parameter (computer programming), a piece of data provided as input to a subroutine
Argument principle, a theorem in complex analysis 
An argument of a function, also known as an independent variable

Language and rhetoric
Argument (literature), a brief summary, often in prose, of a poem or section of a poem or other work
Argument (linguistics), a phrase  that appears in a syntactic relationship with the verb in a clause
Oral argument in the United States, a spoken presentation to a judge or appellate court by a lawyer (or parties when representing themselves) of the legal reasons why they should prevail
Closing argument, in law, the concluding statement of each party's counsel reiterating the important arguments in a court case

Other uses
Musical argument, a concept in the theory of musical form
Argument (ship), an Australian sloop wrecked in 1809
Das Argument, a German academic journal
Argument Clinic, a Monty Python sketch
A disagreement between two or more parties or the discussion of the disagreement
Argument (horse)

See also
The Argument (disambiguation)